Chevening is a village and civil parish in the Sevenoaks District of Kent, England. It was the location for the world's earliest known organised cricket match.

The parish is located to the north west of Sevenoaks on the southern slopes of the North Downs. It had a population of 3,092 at the 2011 Census. Apart from the village the remaining area is rural. Chevening House is located here. The Pilgrims' Way crosses the parish. Close to Chevening, the path of Harold Godwinson's army en route to the Battle of Hastings in 1066, heading south along what is now Chipstead Lane, crosses William the Conqueror's route after the battle towards London along the Pilgrim's Way.

The village of Chevening is also small. It stands on the upper reaches of the River Darent. The village lies very close to the M25 motorway.

Parish Church
The parish church is dedicated to St Botolph. It is within the diocese of Rochester, and the deanery of Shoreham. The church has an albaster tomb to the lord of the manor, Sampson Lennard, and his wife Margaret, Lady Dacre. The church office, parish hall and rectory are located 1.3 miles distant from the parish church, on the outskirts of the village of Chipstead.

The church is linked with Chevening (St Botolph's) Church of England Voluntary Aided Primary School, which is located 1 mile from the church, also in the village of Chipstead.

Cricket
Chevening was the venue for the world's earliest known organised cricket match. The match can be deduced from a 1640 court case recording a "cricketing" of "Weald and Upland" against "Chalkhill" at Chevening "about thirty years since" (i.e. around 1611). The case concerned the land on which the game was played.

Railway
Chevening was served by a halt on the Westerham Valley Branch Line running between Westerham and Dunton Green: the branch opened in 1881 but the halt at Chevening was not added until 1906 when steam railmotor services began on the line. Both line and halt closed in 1961.

References

External links
 Location map and historical notes
 Chevening Parish Council website
 Chevening parish news

1611 establishments in England
Civil parishes in Kent
Cricket grounds in Kent
Cricket in Kent
Defunct cricket grounds in England
Defunct sports venues in Kent
English cricket in the 14th to 17th centuries
History of Kent
Villages in Kent